Beechmont Country Club is a golfing country club located in Orange, Ohio, USA, located approximately  east of downtown Cleveland.  This golf club hosted PGA events such as the 1963 and 1971 Cleveland Open.  The course, designed by Stanley Thompson, was opened in 1923 and is regarded as among the most difficult courses in northeast Ohio. Par is 71.

History
Beechmont Country Club was founded in 1923 by a group of amateur golfers from Cleveland. They purchased  of land covered in trees, and gave Thompson the opportunity to design the course.  One interesting aspect of the course is that water comes into play on 7 of the 18 holes.

The club also contains an indoor and outdoor tennis facility, an outdoor swimming pool, a summer camp for children, workout facilities, and locker rooms for both men and women members. The club has two restaurants (one is men only), a snack shop, fully stocked beverage cart on the course, and a full service outdoor patio.

The golf operations is headed under Jaysen Hansen, PGA. The Assistant Professionals are Brian Suydam and Frederique Bruell. The Superintendent is Adam Daroczy.

Course characteristics
Beechmont Slope, Rating, and Yardage

Tournaments at Beechmont
Beechmont Country Club hosted PGA events such as the inaugural 1963 Cleveland Open along with the same event in 1971.

References

Golf clubs and courses in Ohio
Buildings and structures in Cuyahoga County, Ohio